Barney Samuel Semmelman (January 22, 1877 - July 3, 1925) was a German-American politician and Democratic member of the Mississippi House of Representatives, representing Clay County, from 1916 to 1917.

Biography 
Barney Samuel Semmelman was born on January 22, 1877, in Leutenberg, German Empire. He was the son of Charles Semmelman and his wife Esther, who were paternal cousins. He was Jewish. He had an older brother, Herman, who died in 1912. The family moved to Brooklyn when Barney was about 10 years old. He and his brother came to Clay County, Mississippi, in 1898. He was a Captain of Company G of the 2nd Ind. Battalion of the Mississippi National Guard. He was elected to represent Clay County as a Democrat in the Mississippi House of Representatives in November 1915, receiving 866 out of 1300 total votes polled. He resigned from this position in 1917 to serve in the US Army during World War I. He died on July 3, 1925, and was buried in the Jewish section of the Friendship Cemetery in Columbus, Mississippi.

References 

1877 births
1925 deaths
Democratic Party members of the Mississippi House of Representatives
People from Saalfeld-Rudolstadt
German emigrants to the United States
Mississippi National Guard personnel
People from West Point, Mississippi
Jewish American state legislators in Mississippi